UNESCO established its Lists of Intangible Cultural Heritage with the aim of ensuring better protection of important intangible cultural heritages worldwide and the awareness of their significance. Elements inscribed in the lists are deemed as significant bastions of humanity's intangible heritage, the highest honour for intangible heritage in the world stage.

Intangible Cultural Heritage

See also 
List of World Heritage Sites in Armenia

References 

 Armenian culture
Armenia